Southern Cross Broadcasting (Australia) Limited was a diversified Australian media company, that owned and operated a variety of media businesses, primarily in radio and television.

History
Tony Bell was managing director of the business between 1993 and 2007, when it was purchased to become Southern Cross Media Group, and retired from the subsequent company's board of directors in 2014.

 September 1998 - Southern Cross Broadcasting announces it will purchase Adelaide's Channel Nine station (NWS-9) for $98 million, which led to redundancies for nearly half of the station's staff.
 May 2001 - It announced a $217 million bid for Telecasters Australia, owner of television stations in regional Queensland, northern New South Wales, Darwin and Remote/Central Australia markets.
 April 2002 - It purchased Spencer Gulf Telecasters, owner of regional South Australia's GTS/BKN stations.
 30 May 2007 - It announced its sale of Channel Nine Adelaide to WIN Corporation for A$105 million.
 3 July 2007 - Southern Cross Broadcasting recommended Macquarie Media Group's offer of A$1.35 billion, for a takeover of the corporation. The proposed Scheme is subject to approval by SCB shareholders at a Scheme Meeting expected to be held in October 2007.

 3 July 2007 - If the sale to Macquarie Media Group is successful, MMG have a separate arrangement directly with Fairfax Media to on-sell to them Southern Cross Broadcasting's radio assets, as well as the Southern Star Group, Satellite Music Australia and their digital media businesses. Only Southern Cross's television stations would remain with Macquarie Media Group. Conversely, Fairfax's radio assets would become part of Maquarie.
 5 November 2007 - The company's assets were officially acquired by the Macquarie Media Group.

Assets

Television stations
Southern Cross Ten
CTC - Australian Capital Territory/Southern NSW (Canberra)
GLV/BCV - Victoria (Bendigo, Ballarat, Gippsland, Albury-Wodonga)
NRN - Northern NSW/Gold Coast QLD (Newcastle, Central Coast, North Coast, Northern Rivers, Gold Coast)
TNQ - Queensland (Toowoomba, Mackay, Rockhampton, Townsville, Cairns)
SGS/SCN - South Australia (Spencer Gulf region of South Australia and Broken Hill, New South Wales)
Southern Cross Television
TNT - Tasmania (Hobart and Launceston)
TND - Northern Territory (Darwin)
GTS/BKN - South Australia (Spencer Gulf region of South Australia and Broken Hill, New South Wales)
QQQ - Central Australia (Remote Eastern, Southern and Central Australia)
 Tasmanian Digital Television (50% share with WIN Corporation)
 Channel Nine Adelaide (NWS) (Channel Nine station located in Adelaide) (Purchased by WIN Corporation on 30 May 2007)
 MyTalk

Radio stations
Talk stations
2UE
3AW
4BC
6PR
Music stations
96fm
Magic 1278
4BH

Other businesses
Southern Star Group
Southern Cross Telecommunications
Southern Cross Sales
Southern Cross View
Southern Cross Syndication
Southern Cross SMA
MyTalk.com.au

See also
Fairfax Media
Macquarie Media Group

References

External links
Southern Cross Broadcasting
Southern Star Group
Satellite Music Australia

Television broadcasting companies of Australia
Companies listed on the Australian Securities Exchange
Defunct broadcasting companies of Australia